Saltholmen Lighthouse is a lighthouse in Lillesand municipality in Agder county, Norway. There has been a lighthouse here since 1882. The island (and lighthouse) are named Saltholmen (lit. "Salty Islet"). This name comes from the salt extraction industry established by Hans Nielsen Hauge that once was located there. The lighthouse is only accessible by boat and the site is open, but the building is not open to the public.

Current lighthouse
The present lighthouse was built in 1952 to replace the older building located on the same site. The white, red, or green light (depending on direction) emits two flashes every 15 seconds.

History
The lighthouse was commissioned in 1882. The original lighthouse was built of concrete, and has an octagonal tower with a spire in a corner. The shape of the tower is rarely seen in Norway and the lighthouse is largely preserved as it was built. The lighthouse is therefore protected under the law on cultural heritage. The lighthouse was closed in 1952 and the present lighthouse was constructed immediately next to it. The original lighthouse was white with a sharply pyramidal gray roof. In 2012, the old lighthouse buildings were transferred to a non-profit foundation to preserve them as a museum.

See also

 List of lighthouses in Norway
Lighthouses in Norway

References

External links
 Norsk Fyrhistorisk Forening 

Lighthouses completed in 1882
Listed lighthouses in Norway
Lillesand
Lighthouses in Agder